Tondon is a town in western Guinea. It is located in Dubreka Prefecture in the Kindia Region. Population 16,030 (2008 est). It lies about 180 kilometers from Conakry.

References

External links
Satellite map at Maplandia.com

Sub-prefectures of the Kindia Region